Bae Seung-hee (born 20 September 1983) is a badminton player from South Korea. She is best remembered for her role in South Korea's first ever Uber Cup victory in 2010.

Bae was on the South Korean national team shortly after graduating from junior eligibility but from age 19 to 25, she played only for her domestic team Korea Ginseng Corporation, and competed overseas only twice between April 2003 and November 2008.  She was called back to the national team after winning a national event in 2008 and in August 2009, she reached her first of two consecutive finals at the Chinese Taipei Open.

In 2010, she played first singles at the Uber Cup and in the final, beat then world #1 Wang Yihan to begin South Korea's 3–1 victory.

In 2011, Bae injured her thigh in a domestic tournament and as it caused her to miss the first part of the qualifying period for the London Olympics, she finally decided to leave international badminton at the age of 28.

Achievements

Asian Junior Championships
Girls' singles

Mixed doubles

BWF Grand Prix 
The BWF Grand Prix has two levels: Grand Prix and Grand Prix Gold. It is a series of badminton tournaments, sanctioned by Badminton World Federation (BWF) since 2007. The World Badminton Grand Prix sanctioned by International Badminton Federation (IBF) since 1983.

Women's singles

Women's doubles

 BWF Grand Prix Gold tournament
 BWF & IBF Grand Prix tournament

BWF International Challenge/Series
Women's singles

Women's doubles

 BWF International Challenge tournament
 BWF International Series tournament

References

External links
 

South Korean female badminton players
1983 births
Living people
Sportspeople from South Gyeongsang Province
Asian Games medalists in badminton
Badminton players at the 2002 Asian Games
Badminton players at the 2010 Asian Games
Asian Games silver medalists for South Korea
Asian Games bronze medalists for South Korea
Medalists at the 2002 Asian Games
Medalists at the 2010 Asian Games
21st-century South Korean women